Marietta Brew Appiah-Oppong (born in Tema), is a Ghanaian female legal practitioner and a former Attorney General of Ghana and Minister for Justice of Ghana. She was appointed by President Mahama in 2013. She is the second woman to hold this office in the country, the first being Mrs. Betty Mould-Iddrisu. Her tenure as Attorney General of Ghana ended on 6 January 2017. She was appointed to serve on the Court of Arbitration of the International Chamber of Commerce from 1 July 2018 for a three-year term. She is Honorary Council Member of the Ghana Association of Restructuring and Insolvency Advisors (GARIA).

Education
Marietta started her education at the Tema Parents Association School. She had her secondary education at the St Roses Senior High (Akwatia) where she sat for the Ordinary Level Certificate (O level) and Advanced Level Certificate (A level). She later obtained her Bachelor of Laws (LLB) degree from the University of Ghana, Legon and her Professional Certificate to practice law from the Ghana School of Law, (Makola). She then went to the Institute of Social Studies, Hague in the Netherlands, for her Post Graduate Degree.

Career
Marietta has been a practising lawyer for the past twenty years where she started her practice at Fugar and Co. law firm. She then moved to become senior partner at Lithur Brew and Co law firm. She is an Honorary Council member of the Ghana Association of Restructuring and Insolvency Advisors (GARIA).

Politics
She was a member of the Ghana @50 Commission of Enquiry and also a board member of the Volta River Authority (VRA) appointed by the late President John Atta-Mills in 2009. Marietta Brew Appiah-Oppong was appointed as the Attorney General of Ghana and Minister for Justice of Ghana by the former President John Dramani Mahama from February, 2013 to 6 January 2017.

International Chamber of Commerce
In June 2018, she was appointed to serve a 3-year term on the International Chamber of Commerce's Court of Arbitration for a three-year stint spanning 1 July 2018 – 30 June 2021. The decision to appoint her was taken on June 21, 2018, at the ICC's World Council Meeting in Paris.

See also
List of Mahama government ministers

References

Living people
Year of birth missing (living people)
Justice ministers of Ghana
National Democratic Congress (Ghana) politicians
Attorneys General of Ghana
21st-century Ghanaian politicians
21st-century Ghanaian women politicians
Women government ministers of Ghana
University of Ghana alumni
Ghana School of Law alumni
International Institute of Social Studies alumni
Female justice ministers
Alumni of St Roses Senior High school (Akwatia)
Ghanaian women lawyers